The Book of Nunnaminster (London, British Library, Harley MS 2965) is a 9th-century Anglo-Saxon prayerbook. It was written in the kingdom of Mercia, using an "insular" hand (as used in the British Isles), related to Carolingian minuscule. It was probably later owned by Ealhswith, wife of Alfred the Great. It is related to, but of an earlier date than, the Book of Cerne, and also to the Royal Prayerbook and the Harleian prayerbook. Like Cerne it contains the Passion narratives of the four Gospels and a collection of non-liturgical prayers, many of which relate to the Passion. The Book of Nunnaminster shares some poems with the Book of Cerne. It also includes some decorated initials.

The 'Nunnaminster' was another name for St Mary's Abbey, Winchester.

References

External links
 British Library Digital Catalogue of Illuminated Manuscripts entry
More information at Earlier Latin Manuscripts

9th-century books

Christian illuminated manuscripts
Hiberno-Saxon manuscripts
9th-century Christian texts
Christian prayer books
Harleian Collection
9th-century Latin writers
9th-century English writers